"My Number One" is a song by Elena Paparizou that won the Eurovision Song Contest.

My Number One may also refer to:
My Number One (album), an alternative title for Protereotita, an album by Helena Paparizou containing the song "My Number One"
"My Number One" (Luv' song), a single and song by Luv' from the 1980 album Forever Yours

See also
"He's My Number One", a 1980 song by Australian pop singer Christie Allen
"My Number One Doctor", an episode of the TV series Scrubs
You're My Number One, a 1999 song by the English pop group S Club 7
Number One (disambiguation)